"Settin' the Woods on Fire" was the A-side  of a single by Hank Williams (opposed by "You Win Again"), released in September 1952.  The song reached number 2 on U.S. Billboard Most Played by Jockeys chart and number 2 on the National Best Sellers chart.

Background
Although it sounds remarkably like a Hank Williams composition, "Settin' the Woods on Fire" was written by Hank's song publisher and producer Fred Rose and an elderly New Yorker, Ed G. Nelson.  Williams recorded it with Rose producing at Castle Studio on June 13, 1952 in Nashville, with Jerry Rivers (fiddle), Don Helms (steel guitar), and Harold Bradley (rhythm guitar), while it is speculated that Chet Atkins played lead guitar and Ernie Newton played bass. The song peaked at number 2, while the B-side, "You Win Again," climbed to number 10.  Author Colin Escott offers that the song "pointed unerringly toward rockabilly," 

In 2007, an episode of The Batman was released called "Two of a Kind", in which Joker and Harley Quinn sing the song while causing chaos in Gotham City.

Cover versions 
Frankie Laine and Jo Stafford released a duet in 1952.
Jerry Lee Lewis recorded an unissued version of the song for Sun Records in 1958.
Johnny Burnette released a version in 1958.
George Jones covered the song for his 1960 album George Jones Salutes Hank Williams.
Porter Wagoner recorded it on his 1963 LP A Satisfied Mind.
Mason Proffit recorded it for their 1973 album Bareback Rider.
Chris LeDoux recorded the song on his Western Underground album in 1991.
The Tractors recorded the song for their 1994 eponymous debut album.
Matchbox recorded the song for their 1978 album Settin' the Woods on Fire.

Chart performance

References

1952 songs
Songs written by Fred Rose (songwriter)
Hank Williams songs
MGM Records singles
Song recordings produced by Fred Rose (songwriter)